Adam de Ireys was an English nobleman who was knighted after service during the First Crusade.

Life and the Crusades 
De Ireys was born in 1070 in the town of Ireys in Dorset, England

In 1096, Ireys accompanied Godfrey of Bouillon to Palestine on the First Crusade.  In 1099, De Ireys played an active part in the taking of Jerusalem. During combat, de Ireys decapitated a high ranking Saracen with one sword blow.  His son Hugh D'Iryshe (spelling was changed) was born near Jerusalem.

For his service in the Crusade, de Ireys was knighted and given the right to a Coat of Arms. He became a member of the Knights Hospitaller.

Marriage 
De Ireys married Joan Stutville, born in 1074 in Ireys. Stutville died around 1118 in Dorset.

Death 
Adam de Ireys died in England, in 1117.

References

1070 births
1117 deaths